The Under Secretary of Homeland Security for Management is a high level civilian official in the United States Department of Homeland Security. The Under Secretary, as head of the Management Directorate at DHS, is the principal staff assistant and adviser to both the Secretary of Homeland Security and the Deputy Secretary of Homeland Security for all aspects of DHS administration, finance, and personnel issues.

The Under Secretary is appointed from civilian life by the President with the consent of the Senate to serve at the pleasure of the President. Randolph Alles is the current Acting Under Secretary for Management.

Overview
The Under Secretary of Homeland Security for Management (USM), as the chief operating officer of the Department, is responsible for Department-wide administrative support services and oversight for all support functions, including: IT, budget and financial management, procurement and acquisition, human capital, security, and administrative services. The Under Secretary also provides the overarching management structure for the Department to deliver customer services, while eliminating redundancies and reducing support costs in order to more effectively and efficiently run the Department in a unified manner

With the rank of Under Secretary, the USM is a Level II position within the Executive Schedule. Since January 2021, the annual rate of pay for Level II is $203,700.

Reporting officials
Officials reporting to the USM include:
Deputy Under Secretary of Homeland Security for Management
DHS Chief Financial Officer
DHS Chief Security Officer
DHS Chief Human Capital Officer
DHS Chief Readiness Support Officer
DHS Chief Procurement Officer
DHS Chief Information Officer

Budget

 Amounts include Title 5 funding for DHS HQ Consolidation, Financial Systems Modernization, Cyber Security fund, and rescissions, where applicable.

References